Đorđe Gerum (born 1940) is a football manager and former player who played for Partizan and has managed Sloboda Tuzla, Budućnost Podgorica and Eskişehirspor to name a few.

Career
Born in Pančevo, Kingdom of Yugoslavia, Gerum began playing football for local side FK Dinamo Pančevo and later joined FK Partizan. He also played for FK Proleter Zrenjanin, and, afterwards, for FK Sloboda Tuzla and was part of the side that reached the final of the 1970-71 Yugoslav Cup.

After his playing career ended, Gerum became a football manager. He was appointed manager of Sloboda Tuzla beginning in 1976, leading the club to a best-ever third-place finish in the Yugoslav First League. He became manager of Süper Lig side Eskişehirspor during 1986. He also managed FK Budućnost Podgorica and FK Spartak Subotica.

References

External links
Georgi Gerum manager stats in Turkey at mackolik.com

1940 births
Living people
Sportspeople from Pančevo
Association football midfielders
Yugoslav footballers
Serbian footballers
FK Partizan players
FK Proleter Zrenjanin players
FK Sloboda Tuzla players
Yugoslav First League players
Yugoslav football managers
Serbian football managers
FK Budućnost Podgorica managers
Eskişehirspor managers
Süper Lig managers